Daniel Richard Gottlieb (born April 18, 1953) is an American drummer. He was a founding member of the Pat Metheny Group and was co-founder of Elements with Mark Egan.

Biography
Gottlieb was born in New York City on April 18, 1953. He took lessons from Mel Lewis and Joe Morello and graduated from the University of Miami in 1975. Morello was his lifelong teacher, beginning in 1968 and through the late 1990s. He became a member of the Gary Burton Quartet in 1976 with Pat Metheny. He was one of the original members of The Pat Metheny Group from 1977 to 1983. Bassist Mark Egan was also in Metheny's first group. Egan and Gottlieb formed the band Elements.

In 1982, Gottlieb toured with Flora Purim and Airto Moreira. Gottlieb played with singer Michael Franks in 1983, and the following year toured with trumpeter Randy Brecker and saxophonist Stan Getz. He was, for a short time in 1984, a member of the Mahavishnu Orchestra led by guitarist John McLaughlin. He was also part of the band Second Story Television in 1985 and was a regular member of Gil Evans' orchestra from 1986 until Evans died two years later.

"From 1991 Gottlieb made a number of visits to Germany to perform with the WDR Big Band in collaboration with Bob Brookmeyer, George Gruntz, and Dino Saluzzi." In the mid-1990s he was part of less jazz-oriented and more vocal-based performances: Booker T. & the M.G.'s, and accompanying The Manhattan Transfer.

Gottlieb is currently on faculty at the University of North Florida School of Music and performs with the Lt. Dan Band.

Discography

References

1953 births
American jazz drummers
Living people
University of North Florida faculty
Mahavishnu Orchestra members
Pat Metheny Group members
20th-century American drummers
American male drummers
American male jazz musicians
Elements (band) members
The Blues Brothers members
Lt. Dan Band members